Lloyd Thomas Baxter (January 18, 1923 – February 2, 2010) was a center in the National Football League.

Biography
Baxter was born on January 18, 1923, in Howe, Texas.

Career
Baxter was drafted by the Green Bay Packers in the twenty-fourth round of the 1945 NFL Draft and would later play with the team during the 1948 NFL season. He played at the collegiate level at Southern Methodist University and Louisiana Tech University.

See also
List of Green Bay Packers players

References

People from Grayson County, Texas
Green Bay Packers players
American football centers
SMU Mustangs football players
Louisiana Tech Bulldogs football players
1923 births
2010 deaths